The 1997 Princeton Tigers football team was an American football team that represented Princeton University during the 1997 NCAA Division I-AA football season. Princeton tied for fifth in the Ivy League.

In their 11th year under head coach Steve Tosches, the Tigers compiled a 6–4 record and outscored opponents 148 to 132. Mike Clifford and Tim Greene were the team captains.

Princeton's 4–3 conference record tied for fifth in the Ivy League standings. The Tigers were outscored 90 to 87 by Ivy opponents. 

For the first time in more than a century, Princeton played none of its home games on campus, as Palmer Stadium had been demolished and construction of its replacement, Princeton University Stadium, was still in progress. The Tigers' two "home" games were played at Lions Stadium, the home field of The College of New Jersey, and at Giants Stadium, the New Jersey home of two NFL teams.

Schedule

Note

References

Princeton
Princeton Tigers football seasons
Princeton Tigers football